Staur Farm is a farm located in Stange, Norway. It is owned by the Norwegian Ministry of Agriculture and Food, and operates both a facility for agricultural research, as well as a conference hotel in the mansion. The farm has  of fields. The research is conducted by Graminor, Norsk Kjøttfeavlslag, Geno and Nortura. The conference hotel has been used by the government of Norway for an annual, important planning conference.

References

Farms in Innlandet
Stange
Companies based in Hedmark